Sydney, Australia is served by a number of bus operators, with Busways the largest privately owned operator in New South Wales as of January 2022 when the company took-over the NSW government's State Transit Authority. Other major operators include CDC, Transdev and Transit Systems. Most services are provided as part of the city's integrated public transport system, with routes, fares, service levels, fleet specifications and customer service standards determined by Transport for NSW. A small number of services operate outside of this network.

History
Until the 1990s all of Sydney's private bus services were run by family owned companies. The Passenger Transport Act 1990 requiring average fleet ages to be maintained at no more than 12 years and minimum service levels, resulted in many of the smaller operators selling out to larger operators.

But even these larger operators such as Baxter's, Busways, North & Western, Shorelink, South Trans, Transit First and Westbus, were still owned by Australian families. In the late 1990s and early 2000s multi-national transport operators including Connex, ComfortDelGro, National Express and Transdev began to buy up some of these larger operators.

In March 2004 the Minister for Transport released the final report of Barrie Unsworth's Review of Bus Services in NSW. At that stage Sydney's bus operating contracts were divided into 87 contract areas. After recommendations from Unsworth's report, the contract regions were consolidated into 15 regions with seven year contracts negotiated with the operators. These contracts are known as Sydney Metropolitan Bus Service Contracts.

Contract regions

Bus contracts in Sydney are known as the Sydney Metropolitan Bus Service Contracts (SMBSC). There are 14 contract regions as of September 2022.

List of current bus operators in Sydney
 Busabout
Operates bus services in the Campbelltown and Camden areas. Also operates services in Wagga Wagga as Busabout Wagga Wagga.
Busways
Operates region 1 bus services in the Blacktown, Mount Druitt,  and Rouse Hill areas, as well as services on the North-West T-way. Also operates region 7 bus services on the North Shore and in Northern Sydney. Also operates on the Central Coast and Northern Rivers.
Forest Coach Lines
Operates bus services in region 14 Sydney's northern suburbs linking the city and Lower & Mid North Shore. A subsidiary of ComfortDelGro Australia since September 2018.
Hillsbus
A subsidiary of ComfortDelGro Australia. Operates region 4 bus services from depots at Dural, Northmead and Seven Hills and runs services in the Baulkham Hills, Rouse Hill and Blacktown areas, as well as services on the North-West T-way.
Interline Bus Services
Keolis Downer Northern Beaches
Operates region 8 bus services on the Northern Beaches and the Lower North Shore. Also operates on-demand services on the Northern Beaches. A subsidiary of Keolis Downer.
Maianbar Bundeena Bus Service
Operates a bus service between Maianbar and Bundeena
Punchbowl Bus Company
Also operates services in Goulburn as PBC Goulburn.
Transdev John Holland
Operates region 9 bus services between the Eastern Suburbs and CBD. A 75/25 joint venture between Transdev and John Holland.
Transdev NSW
Operates bus services in Sydney's southern suburbs, Hornsby area and the Upper North Shore.
Transit Systems
Operates bus services in Western Sydney and services on the Liverpool-Parramatta T-way, and from July 2018, region 6 in the Inner West.

List of defunct bus operators in Sydney
In the past, many of Sydney's bus services were operated by small companies, particularly in the middle and outer suburbs. Some of these companies only operated one or two routes.  Most operated before the current revised route numbers and contract areas were introduced.

Most defunct operators either had their companies acquired, had all their services transferred to other operators, merged to form larger companies, or renamed. A change of ownership without a change of operator name is not considered defunct. Some operators do not operate public routes or services anymore but still operate as charter companies.

Currently charter/tour operators
These operators, though not operating public routes anymore, still operate charter and/or tour services.
 Australia Wide Coaches
Operates charter services from the Mascot area. Never operated Sydney Bus routes but operates a coach service between Sydney and Orange.
 Baxter's Bus Lines
Operated bus services in the western suburbs. Granville, Bass Hill services transferred to Veolia Transport NSW and Transit First respectively in January 2005. The rest of the services (Region 3) were sold to Westbus in 2006. Remains a tour and charter company only.
 Crowthers (BusLink)
Operated bus services in and around Miranda, Cronulla and Kurnell until services were taken over by Veolia Transport NSW in 2009. Remains a coach charter company.
Hopkinsons
Operated services in the Parramatta and Merrylands area (Region 3) until 13 October 2013, when routes were transferred to Transit Systems. Remains a tour and charter company.
Metro-link Bus Lines
Operated feeder buses in Sydney's south west to Liverpool station (Region 3) until 13 October 2013, when routes were transferred to Transit Systems. Remains a coach charter company.
Moore's Tours
Operated route 954 from a depot in Blakehurst until 2004 when route taken over by Punchbowl Bus Company. Was an associated company of Harris Park Transport until 2004. Remains a charter operator only.
Murrays
Operated routes 6 and 49 in southern Sydney until they were sold to Brighton Bus Lines in October 1982. Remains and has grown into a large coach charter company.
 Sydney Coachlines
Operated routes 6, 49 and 68. Route 49 taken over by Pioneer Coaches and routes 6 and 68 by Sydney Buses in October 1996. Remains a coach charter company.

Renamed or merged operators
Campbelltown Transit Company
Operated services in Campbelltown. Rebranded as Busways in 1988
Caringbah Bus Service
Operated bus services in Sydney's south. Services sold to Veolia Transport NSW in October 2011. Now a charter company with the name Tiger Tours, was sold to Telford's in June 2015
 Connex Southtrans
Operated bus services in Sydney's south. Later renamed Connex NSW in 2002, then rebranded as Veolia Transport NSW in April 2006.
Deanes Coaches (South)
Renamed Southtrans in 1989 (later taken over by Connex in 1999). Now operates as Transdev NSW
Glenorie Bus Company
Rebranded as Hillsbus in December 2004, along with Westbus' Hills District routes.
Hawkesbury Valley Buses
Operated services in north western Sydney (Region 1) until the 6 October 2013 when routes were transferred to Busways. Same ownership as Busabout since the 1990s. Continued as a charter company but ceased 24 April 2017.
 Katen & Heath
Founded 1956, became Bustrans in 1996.
Hornsby Bus Group
Operated services in the north shore. Renamed Shorelink in 1988.
Liverpool Transport Company
Bought by the Calabro family in 1994, then retained this operating name until 2001 when it was merged with the Calabro's neighbouring Busabout operations.
Macarthur Coaches
Operated services in Macarthur and Camden. Rebranded as Busways in 1988
Marrickville Bus Lines
Operated route 448 in Marrickville until route was transferred to State Transit in 2004. Now a charter company trading as Telfords Bus & Coach.
Revesby Bus and Coach Service
Merged into Crossley Bus Lines and renamed in 1996.
Rowe's Bus Service
Rebranded as Busways in 1988
Shorelink
Operated services in the north shore. Previously known as Hornsby Bus Group prior to 1998. Renamed TransdevTSL Shorelink in 2008 before reverting to Transdev Shorelink Buses in 2010. Operations absorbed into Transdev NSW in 2014.
 Veolia Transport NSW
Operated bus services in Sydney's south. Rebranded as Transdev NSW in July 2013.
Westbus (Hills District)
Westbus' Hills District routes rebranded as Hillsbus in December 2004. Other Westbus routes were unaffected by the rebranding.
 Westbus
A subsidiary of ComfortDelGro Australia. Operated services in Western Sydney in region 1 until the 6 October 2013 and region 3 until the 13 October 2013. Westbus was replaced by Busways in region 1 and Transit Systems in region 3. Charter work is now done by CDC Travel.
 Westway Bus and Coach Service
Rebranded as Transit First in 2003
Woronora Bus Service
Operated services in Woronora. Renamed Menai Bus Service in the 1970s.

Other defunct operators
 ABC Coach Lines
Operated routes 451-455 until they were handed over to Sydney Buses as caretaker in 1990
 Allways Bus Service
Formerly Allways Lidcombe-Auburn Bus Service. Operated route 455 until it was sold to Pioneer Coaches in May 1992.
 Auburn Coaches
Operated routes 405 and 406 in Auburn. Route 405 sold to Baxter's Bus Lines and 406 to  Parramatta-Ryde Bus Service in March 1993. Formerly known as Auburn Bus Service. Was part of Nowra Coaches between August and September 1990, between October 1990 and February 1991, and between February 1993 to March 1993.
 Bankstown–Eldridge Rd Bus Service
Operated route 20 from Bankstown station to Eldridge Road (Bankstown Hospital). Sold to Bass Hill Bus Service in 1977.
Bankstown-Strathfield Bus Service
Operated routes 484–86 in Bankstown, Greenacre and Strathfield. Under same ownership as West Bankstown Bus Service. Operations of both bus companies taken over by Westway (later renamed Transit First) in 2003
Barklimore Bros
Operated routes 153 and 214 in Merrylands until taken over by Baxter's Bus Lines in 1981. Routes now operated by Transit Systems.
 Barnes Coaches
Operated routes 54, 124, 221 and 224 until taken over by Deanes Coaches in November 1970.
 Bass Hill Bus Service
Operated routes 20 and 21. Services sold to Baxter's Bus Lines in 1995 and renumbered 930 and 932 soon afterwards.
Belmore Lakemba Bus Company
Operated route 35 Belmore Lakemba via Roselands Shopping Centre and route 92 Bardwell Park to Roselands 1966 to early 80s their Depot was behind BP service station on Kingsgrove Road at Kingsgrove next to old gas tank (now removed). Believed to have been sold to Pleasure Tours in the early 80s
 Bowden's Bus Service
Operated route 79 from City to Tamarama until taken over by Public Transport Commission in June 1974
Brighton Bus Lines
Operated route 196 in the Brighton and Kyeemagh areas until 1993 when the route was bought by State Transit, becoming the 479. The company carried an orange livery with a blue stripe.
Bustrans
Operated Routes 817 and 818 in the Fairfield area. It was taken over by Baxter's Bus Lines in April 2004 after an accident where Bustrans was found to have defective buses.
Calabro's
Operated routes around Cabramatta and Fairfield. Taken over by Westbus in 1989.
Canterbury Bus Lines
Operated routes 450 and 451 until routes taken over by Punchbowl Bus Company in 1998. Part of Highway Tours until 1987, then under Eddie Hayman and Colin Crossley's ownership
Carss Park Charter Tours and Buslines
Operated routes 958 and 959 until taken over by Southtrans in December 1993
Challenge Travel
Formerly Bankstown Lakemba Bus Lines and Bankstown Coaches (unrelated to the current coach operator). Also known as Challenge Coach Lines. Operatex routes 26 in Bankstown and 117/118 in Oatley. Route 26 was sold to Revesby Bus & Coach Service in January 1990 while route 117/118 was sold to Oatley Bus Lines in 1988. Remained a coach operator until sold to Hopkinsons.
Commodore Coaches
Operated routes 46 and 47 in Campsie/Greeenacre before selling them to Newhams Bus Service in August 1989. Operated as tour operator until it was renamed to Compass Tours in 2011.
Crossley Bus Lines
Revesby Bus and Coach Service merged into Crossley in 1996. Services 915–921 sold to Transit First in 1997. Remaining services sold to Connex Southtrans in 2001.
Deanes Coaches (North)
Operated services in the North Shore. Services sold to Hornsby Bus Group and East Lindfield-Killara Bus Service in December 1988. All services now operated by Transdev NSW. 
Delwood Coaches
Operated services in Granville. Services sold to Baxter's Bus Lines in 1992.
Drummond Transit
Operated route 123 from Bankstown to Lidcombe from 1978 until September 1984 when the route was sold to Highway Tours.
Foley's Bus Service
Operated route 32 between Kogarah and Dolls Point. Route transferred to Peakhurst Bus Company in December 1994. Also had a coach operation called Foley's Scenic Tours.
GP Bus Company
Later sold to Punchbowl Bus Company in 1955
Harbour City Coaches
Operated lower North Shore services from 1987 until sold to North & Western Bus Lines in 1989
Harris Park Transport
An associated company of Moore's Tours. Operated routes 620-630 in Carlingford and Cherrybrook and 74/106 in Hurstville. 620-630 were sold to Westbus and 74/106 to Punchbowl Bus Company in December 2004. The Harris Park depot turned into brownfield land, while the North Rocks depot still has a handful of buses and guard dogs, but is no longer in operation.
Highway Tours
Operated a number of routes in the south west as Auburn Passenger Transport, Canterbury Bus Lines, or simply Highway Tours until the late 1980s.
Higlett's Coaches
Acquired by the Rowe family in 1986 and renamed Macarthur Coaches.
 Holsworthy Bus Company
Operated between Holsworthy and Liverpool until 1982.
Jannali Como Bus Service
Operated route 238 sold 1977 to South Western Coach Lines operated services from Jannali to Como and Oyster Bay. Limited services to Sutherland. Owned and operated Jannali Scenic Tours and Opal Field Scenic Tours
 Kogarah–Carss Park Bus Service (Blythe's)
Also known as EH Blythe. Operated route 121 between Kogarah and Carss Park until taken over by Southtrans in April 1994.
Lane Cove Bus Service
Bought bus services in the Lane Cove area from Deanes Coaches in the early 1980s until 1987.
C. A. Leach & Sons
Operated routes 111 and 194 between Hurstville and Kingsgrove from a depot in Cross Street, Hurstville. Transferred to Heron Bus Lines in 1977.
Longueville Motor Bus Company
Operated services in the Lane Cove/Longueville area until 1969 when taken over by Deanes Coaches.
 Macquarie Towns Coach Lines
Operated services in Windsor. Formed from the merger of Gosper's Bus Service with Duffy's Bus Lines in 1981. Sold to Westbus in 1988.
Manly Coaches
McVicar's Bus Services
Operated routes, mainly out of Bankstown until 1978 when operations were sold to various bus companies.
Menai Bus Service
Formerly known as Woronora Bus Service. Operated services in Menai. Sold to Deanes Coaches in 1988. Services now operated by Transdev NSW.
Midshore Busways
Routes taken over by Shorelink
Milperra Bus Service
Operated routes around Bankstown until 1987, when taken over by Westway (later renamed Transit First).
Narwee Bus Service
Taken over by Punchbowl Bus Company in the late 1950s
North & Western Bus Lines
Operated routes in the Ryde area. Sold to Sydney Buses in 1999.
Parramatta-Ryde Bus Service
Also known as Riverside Bus & Coach Service. Operated routes 333, 406, 540 and 555 in the Parramatta area until it was sold to Sydney Buses in 2000.
Parramatta Villawood Bus Service
Operated route 97 and 186. Sold to Delwood Coaches in 1978.
Peakhurst Bus Company (Saints)
Operated three routes (88 and 108) in southern Sydney until 1989 when the routes were taken over by the Punchbowl Bus Company. Operated route 947 in southern Sydney until 1998 when the route was split and sold to Southtrans and Punchbowl Bus. The buses carried a black and white livery.
Pioneer Coaches
Operated routes 452 (formerly 112), 453 and 455 until 2001 when operations were acquired by Connex Southtrans. The company carried a red and blue livery.
Pleasure Tours
Operated routes 446 and 447 until 2005 when routes taken over by Punchbowl Bus Company.
Premier Coaches
Formerly Challenge Travel and Oatley Bus Service. Operated routes 117/118 (some trips operated by Moore's Tours) until taken over by Moore's Tours in December 1999.
Red Top Bus Company
Routes 34 and 39 Strathfield to Hurstville via Roselands Shopping Centre and Campsie, Hurstville via Roselands
Richmond Coaches
Routes absorbed by Westbus
South Sydney Bus Company
Operated services from Central Railway to Maroubra Junction and Brighton-Le-Sands in the 1920s and 1930s.
South Western Coach Lines (Holman family)
Renamed from Hurstville Bus Lines, Kareela Bus Lines and Bankstown Bus Lines. Operated a number of routes in southern Sydney as well as the inner west until the late 1980s. All former South Western services in southern Sydney now operated by Transdev NSW.
Southtrans
Taken over by Connex in the September 1999, then renamed Connex Southtrans. Now operates as Transdev NSW.
St Ives Bus Service
Operated until 1998 when its operations were split between Forest Coach Lines and Shorelink (now Transdev NSW).
State Transit
Government operator, a subsidiary of Transport for NSW. Operated bus services in the Northern Suburbs, City and Eastern Suburbs until they were tendered off to private operates between October 2021 and April 2022
 Toongabbie Buses
Formerly Toongabbie Transport Services. Operated services in Toongabbie and Wentworthville. Routes 700 and 705 taken over from Western Road Bus Service in January 1987. Route 715 transferred to Westbus on the same day, followed by the rest of the routes (including 700 and 705) in December 1988.
 Transit First
Operated services in South West Sydney (Region 13). Operations bought by Veolia Transport in 2007.
  West Bankstown Bus Service
Operated routes 935, 936 and 937 in Bankstown, Yagoona and Georges Hall. Same ownership as Bankstown-Strathfield Bus Service. Operations of both bus companies taken over by Westway (later renamed Transit First) in 2003
  Western Road Bus Service
Operated routes 700, 702, 703, 705 and 810 in Wentworthville. 700 and 705 taken over by Toongabbie Buses, while 810 was taken over by Baxter's Bus Lines in January 1987. Routes 702 and 703 discontinued and replaced by other Baxter's routes.

References